Emskirchen is a municipality in the district of Neustadt (Aisch)-Bad Windsheim in Bavaria in Germany.

References

Neustadt (Aisch)-Bad Windsheim